Café Bräunerhof is a traditional Viennese café and restaurant located at Stallburggasse 2 in the Innere Stadt first district in Vienna, Austria. Bräunerhof is best known for being the preferred café of the famous Austrian writer Thomas Bernhard. Today there is a vitrine showing a picture of the author and pointing the direction to the café on a street corner nearby. Every Saturday there is live music at the café with a small orchestra playing waltzes and classical music.

See also
 List of restaurants in Vienna

References

Coffeehouses and cafés in Vienna
Buildings and structures in Innere Stadt